Countess Maria Zofia Czartoryska née Sieniawska (15 April 1699–21 May 1771) was a Polish szlachcianka (noblewoman). By birth she was member of powerful Sieniawski family and by marriage she was member of House of Dönhoff and House of Czartoryski.

Early life
Countess Maria Zofia was daughter of Count Adam Mikołaj Sieniawski and Princess Elżbieta Lubomirska.

First marriage
She married firstly Count Stanislaus Ernst von Dönhoff in 1724. She was his second wife. He was previously married to his cousin, Countess Johanna Katharina von Dönhoff (1686-1723). Maria Zofia's stepdaughter Countess Konstanza von Dönhoff later married Prince Janusz Aleksander Sanguszko.

Inheritance
After her father's death in 1726, Maria Zofia inherited his Ruthenian estates including 35 towns, 235 villages and Berezhany fortress, she was also the only heir of her first husband's estates and of her mother's fortune.

Second marriage
Among the candidates to the hand of one of the wealthiest women in Europe were Prince Charles de Bourbon-Condé, Count of Charolais, supported by France (Louis XV even invited Maria Zofia to Versailles); Portuguese infante Dom Manuel de Bragança supported by the Habsburgs (proposed as the next King of Poland, due to the tenets of the Löwenwolde's Treaty), Jan Klemens Branicki, Franciszek Salezy Potocki, Jan Tarło and August Aleksander Czartoryski, who eventually won the competition, full of duels and speech encounters due to support of Augustus II, as the latter was afraid of increase of power of his opponents. She married August Aleksander Czartoryski on July 17, 1731 in Warsaw.

References

1698 births
1771 deaths
Maria Zofia
Maria Zofia
18th-century Polish women
18th-century Polish nobility